Bronze Rat Records (aka Bronzerat) is a British independent record label, established in London in 2006 by Welsh musician and producer Andrew Zammit, and also encompasses subsidiary label Seriés Aphōnos.

Established in 2006 as an outlet for The Gemma Ray Ritual, Zammit’s band with long-term collaborator Gemma Ray, the label has since has gone on to release all of her solo records, as well as releases by other artists including Dutch experimentalist Solex, Crazy World of Arthur Brown, Berlin instrumentalists The Still, and Joe Gideon.

It also serves as the main outlet in Europe for releases by Jon Spencer including The Jon Spencer Blues Explosion, Heavy Trash and Boss Hog.

The label also had a short-lived stint working with the Seasick Steve, releasing his debut solo records in late 2006 and 2007.

Bronze Rat also has a publishing arm and publishes of the label roster as well as the music of Michael J Sheehy (including Miraculous Mule) and Gris-de-lin amongst others.

The Bronze Rat label’s logo was designed by the artist Rick Froberg.

Discography

Heavy Trash

Seasick Steve

Gemma Ray

Joe Gideon & The Shark

To Arms Etc

Charles Campbell Jones

Trost

Congregation

Seriés Aphōnos

Seriés Aphōnos, a British subsidiary label of Bronze Rat Records, focuses on instrumental music, soundtracks, spoken word, and other curio curations. It is curated by Welsh musician, producer and label owner Andrew Zammit.

Releases include Soft Rains by Zarelli (a musical reinterpretation of a Leonard Nimoy-narrated Ray Bradbury short story from The Martian Chronicles), the first vinyl release of the Krzysztof Komeda-composed soundtrack to Roman Polanski's Dance of the Vampires/Fearless Vampire Killers, Berlin avant-punk collective Candy Bomber (whose album features guest spots from musicians including Gemma Ray, Kid Congo Powers, Toby Dammit and Jochen Arbeit (Einstürzende Neubauten), Cremator (London synth musician Matt Thompson (Zoltan, Guapo)), and The Still, who are a cast of international musicians (including Chris Abrahams of The Necks) who record in Berlin. The Still was featured in British music magazine Mojo 's list of 50 best albums of 2016.

Seriés Aphōnos' themed and recurrent artwork is inspired by the aesthetic of 1970s music libraries (such as Montparnasse 2000, Studio G, and Neuilly), and is based on a template designed and continued by Buffalo, New York artist Julian Montague.

Seriés Aphōnos releases 
SA01 – Solex – Solex Ahoy! The Sound Map Of The Netherlands
SA02 – Gemma Ray – Down Baby Down
SA03 – Tanger Trio & Ensemble Mondaine
SA04 - Krzysztof Komeda - Dance of the Vampires (aka The Fearless Vampire Killers)
SA05 - Cremator - Clear Air Turbulence
SA06 - Zarelli - Soft Rains (featuring the voice of Leonard Nimoy)
SA07 - Heavy Trash - Noir!
SA08 - The Still - S/T
BR50 - Candy Bomber - Vol. 1

References

External links
 Official website
 Official Gemma Ray Website
 Official Bronze Rat Artist Page
 Independent Music Awards Official website

British record labels